Perfect World Co., Ltd. is a Chinese mass media company based in Beijing. It was founded in 2004 by Chi Yufeng. The company consists of two business segments: Perfect World Games, a video game publisher, and Perfect World Pictures, a film production company.

Perfect World is the exclusive distributor of Valve's games Dota 2 and Counter-Strike: Global Offensive in China.

History 
Perfect World was founded in 2004 by Chi Yufeng. A 1994 graduate of Tsinghua University, Chi had founded Beijing Hongen Education and Technology in 1996, which sold educational software to teach Chinese consumers how to use personal computers and learn English. He established Perfect World, then also known as Perfect World Games, as a developer and publisher of online multiplayer video games. The company became listed on the Nasdaq stock exchange in 2007. In 2008, Chi founded the film production company Perfect World Pictures. After Perfect World Games was delisted from Nasdaq in 2015, it was merged with Perfect World Pictures, which was traded on the Shenzhen Stock Exchange, in 2016. The combined company was renamed Perfect World. Perfect World Investment & Holding Group, a holding company founded by Chi on 14 August 2013, owns a controlling interest in Perfect World.

The transaction was completed by August that year.

Perfect World Entertainment was Perfect World's North American video game subsidiary. It was established in June 2008.

Perfect World sold Perfect World Entertainment and Cryptic Studios to Embracer Group. Both Studios are under Gearbox as of 2021.

Subsidiaries

Perfect World Europe 
Perfect World Europe B.V. is Perfect World's European video game subsidiary. It was established in early 2010 in Amsterdam. Gabriel Hacker was appointed as Perfect World Europe's general manager in May 2012. In early 2020, a large portion of the company's staff was laid off, leaving only the finance, customer support, and localisation departments.

Runic Games 

Runic Games was a developer founded in 2008 and based in Seattle. On 3 November 2017, Perfect World shut down Runic Games, citing the publisher's focus on games as a service.

Collaborations with Valve 
On 25 February 2016, Perfect World hosted Dota 2s Shanghai Major. While the tournament itself was well received in regards to the player performances, the event garnered criticism due to delays on stream, spotty broadcasts, and various other problems within the tournament, including the theft and deterioration of the competing teams' equipment. In the month that followed the event, the president of Perfect World, Yunfan Zhang, apologised for the issues with the event.

In June 2018, Perfect World and Valve announced that they were developing a version of Valve's Steam service for the Chinese market.

Games developed 
 Perfect World – January 2006
 Perfect World II – November 2006 was later rebranded Perfect World International''' and has had 16 expansions from 2008-2021
 Legend of Martial Arts – September 2006
 Jade Dynasty – 3D MMORPG - May 2007
 Chi Bi – January 2008
 Hot Dance Party – March 2008
 Pocketpet Journey West – October 2008
 Battle of the Immortals – April 2009
 Ether Saga Odyssey – July 2009
 Fantasy Zhu Xian – October 2009
 Dragon Excalibur – October 2010
 Forsaken World – October 2010
 Empire of the Immortals – Q4 2010
 War of the Immortals – December 2012
 Swordsman Online – July 2014
 Final Fantasy Type-0 Online – 2017
 Tower of Fantasy'' – August 2022

References

External links 
 

 
2007 initial public offerings
Chinese brands
Chinese companies established in 2004
Companies based in Zhejiang
Companies formerly listed on the Nasdaq
Companies formerly listed on the Tokyo Stock Exchange
Software companies based in Beijing
Video game companies established in 2004
Video game companies of China
Video game development companies
Video game publishers